The 2004 ICC Six Nations Challenge was an international limited-overs cricket tournament held in the United Arab Emirates from 29 February to 6 March 2004. Matches were played in Dubai and Sharjah.

The tournament was the third and final edition of the ICC Six Nations Challenge, and featured six associate members of the International Cricket Council (ICC). Canada, Namibia, and the Netherlands had competed in the 2003 World Cup, while the three other teams invited were Scotland, the United Arab Emirates, and the United States. The six teams played each other once in a round-robin, with five teams finishing with three wins and two losses. The United States emerged as the winners based on net run rate, and consequently qualified for the 2004 ICC Champions Trophy in England, making their One Day International (ODI) debut. American all-rounder Clayton Lambert led the tournament in runs, while Scotland's John Blain was the leading wicket-taker.

Squads
Each team named a squad of 14 players, one coach, one team manager, one physiotherapist, and one umpire.

Points table

Fixtures

Statistics

Most runs
The top five run-scorers are included in this table, ranked by runs scored and then by batting average.

Source: CricketArchive

Most wickets

The top five wicket-takers are listed in this table, ranked by wickets taken and then by bowling average.

Source: CricketArchive

References

External links
 Tournament information at CricketArchive
 Tournament information at ESPNcricinfo

ICC Six Nations Challenge
International cricket competitions in 2003–04
International cricket competitions in the United Arab Emirates
ICC